Cotati (Miwok: Kota’ti) is an incorporated city in Sonoma County, California, United States, located approximately  north of San Francisco in the 101 corridor between Rohnert Park and Petaluma. Cotati's population as of the 2020 Census was 7,584, making it the smallest incorporated community in Sonoma County.

Like all of Sonoma County, Cotati is included in both the San Francisco Bay Area and North Coast. Located in the Sonoma Coast AVA, Cotati can also be considered part of Wine Country. E & J Gallo Winery operates a  vineyard called Two Rock Vineyard in the hills west of town. Cotati's hexagonal downtown plaza, one of only two hexagonal town layouts in the United States, is California Historical Landmark number 879. The other U.S. city with a hexagonal layout is Detroit, Michigan.

History 
The Coast Miwok civilization thrived in the Cotati area since at least 2000 BC, with principal villages built near major streams. Documented villages in the area included Lumen-takala (northeast of present-day Cotati), Payinecha (west of present-day Cotati), and Kotati.

In 1827, an Irishman named John Thomas Reed ventured into Miwok territory and built a cabin near Crane Creek. After the natives burned it, he retreated south to Mill Valley.

Rancho Cotate
In July 1844, the Mexican government granted Rancho Cotate (encompassing present-day towns of Cotati, Penngrove and Rohnert Park, and home to Coast Miwok people) to Captain Juan Castaneda, a Mexican military commander from Texas, in payment for his service as a soldier under General Vallejo. The grant took its name from the Coast Miwok village of Kotati. However, a legend arose that Rancho Cotate was named after a Pomo chief named Cotati, and in 1973 the state perpetuated this legend on the historical marker it placed in the plaza.

Captain Castaneda moved to San Francisco and never developed Rancho Cotate. Because he failed to fulfill the legal requirements of the grant, he lost control of the rancho, which passed to Thomas Larkin and then to Joseph Ruckle. In 1849, Ruckle sold the land to Dr. Thomas Stokes Page, a former resident of Valparaíso, Chile, for $1,600. Rancho Cotate was recorded in California state records as follows:

The landholding remained in the Page family for over eighty years. Subject to seasonal flooding from the Laguna de Santa Rosa, the land was used to graze cattle and sheep. In October 1870, the San Francisco and North Pacific Railroad completed the first railroad from Petaluma to Santa Rosa, and a town formed around the wood and water stop called Page's Station, then Cotati.

Development of a town

Cotati's hexagonal plaza and street grid plan was designed during the 1890s by Newton Smyth as an alternative to the traditional grid. Dr. Thomas Page's barn once stood where the plaza is today, and each of the streets surrounding the plaza is named after one of his sons. In 1892, the Page family created the Cotati Land Company to subdivide their ranch into parcels of five to twenty acres (two to eight hectares). By 1901, good land was selling for $30 to $60 per acre. Page family ownership ended in 1944.

The Cotati area was shaken up by the 1906 San Francisco earthquake. After the quake, Drury Butler reported that "the chimneys were as a rule thrown down". In particular, the Stony Point School at  suffered a chimney failure.

The Northwestern Pacific Railroad built the Cotati Depot in 1907. It was demolished to make way for Sonoma–Marin Area Rail Transit's Cotati station.

Prior to 1915, the major north–south roads (Petaluma Hill Road and Stony Point Road) bypassed Cotati. In that year, the state routed the Redwood Highway (part of U.S. Route 101) onto the mostly unpaved Cotati Boulevard. U.S. 101 passed through the downtown plaza until 1955, when the highway was rerouted further west. U.S. 101 still bisects Cotati, and the former route is called Old Redwood Highway.

In February 1921, the old schoolhouse at 201 West Sierra burned down. A new school built on the same site opened in 1922. This building has served as City Hall since 1971. The rear of this building housed the Cotati Police Department until September 3, 2003, when the department moved into a new building next door.

The Cotati Speedway, a wooden oval track for automobile racing, was built near the depot around 1921. World records were set there, but it failed in its first season and was torn down in 1922.

In 1927, the Cotati Volunteer Fire Department was organized. Since 1993, Cotati has been part of the Rancho Adobe Fire Protection District.

A local weekly newspaper called The Cotatian was established by E. A. Little in 1944 and lasted until 1964. The current local paper is The Community Voice, published in neighboring Penngrove.

Incorporation, growth, and rent control
On July 2, 1963, less than a year after the incorporation of the lands north of town to form Rohnert Park, voters approved (by a 284-to-41 margin) the incorporation of Cotati as a separate city. After incorporation, the city grew rapidly, due in part to being within commuting range of San Francisco. Between 1965 and 2000, the population increased by more than a factor of four.

In 1979, Cotati voters approved a rent control ordinance for all residential rentals, but in 1995, that ordinance was partly preempted by the passage of AB (Assembly Bill) 1164, known as the Costa/Hawkins Bill. At the time, Cotati was one of five cities in California with "strong rent control" laws which included vacancy control. (The other cities were West Hollywood, Santa Monica, Berkeley and East Palo Alto). The Costa/Hawkins bill made it impossible for California municipalities to enforce vacancy control, except in special cases like mobile home parks. When the 1979 ordinance was repealed by Cotati voters in 1998, it was replaced with a more limited ordinance aimed at mobile home parks. At the present time, eight of the nine incorporated areas in Sonoma County have rent control for mobile home parks, the exception being Healdsburg.

In 1990, Cotati citizens voted to impose a limit on future annexation of land by the city. However, on November 4, 2003, Cotati voters approved (by 1,047 votes to 1,013) Measure B, granting an exception to this ordinance so that a Lowe's home improvement warehouse could be built on the west side of U.S. 101.

Budget crisis
In order to cope with declining revenue, the City instituted a series of budget cuts, starting in 2007. As of August 2009, the City expected to run out of money in its General Fund within a year.

In April 2010, Cotati voters passed Measure A, which imposed a 0.5% sales tax for five years. In June 2014, they passed Measure G (by a vote of 922 to 808) to increase the city sales tax to 1%.

Geography

It lies entirely in the drainage basin of the Laguna de Santa Rosa. The Petaluma River watershed begins just south of town. To the west is the Stemple Creek watershed. The sources of all three watercourses lie in the hilly area between Stony Point Road and U.S. 101, just west of town.

A gap in the coastal ridges near Petaluma often allows coastal fog to reach Cotati in the summer, giving it a marine climate that is noticeably cooler and less sunny than the "coastal" climates of nearby Santa Rosa and Sebastopol. Cotati averages fewer than 800 hours per growing season in the  range.

The soils of the Cotati area are characterized by recent alluvial materials, explicitly those areas bordering the Laguna de Santa Rosa and its tributary Washoe Creek. These materials are largely stream and valley alluvium, with artificial fill in some areas.

Active faults near Cotati include the Rodgers Creek Fault ( east) and the Tolay Fault.

To the west of Cotati is wetland habitat for Sebastopol meadowfoam, Pitkin Marsh lily, Showy Indian clover, and several other endangered species.

Demographics

2010
The 2010 United States Census reported that Cotati had a population of 7,265. The racial makeup of Cotati was 5,929 (81.6%) White, 1,255 (17.3%) Hispanic, 122 (1.7%) African American, 75 (1.0%) Native American, 283 (3.9%) Asian, 30 (0.4%) Pacific Islander, 427 (5.9%) from other races, and 399 (5.5%) from two or more races.

The Census reported that 99.9% of the population lived in households and 0.1% lived in non-institutionalized group quarters.

There were 2,978 households, out of which 941 (31.6%) had children under the age of 18 living in them, 1,214 (40.8%) were opposite-sex married couples living together, 399 (13.4%) had a female householder with no husband present, 161 (5.4%) had a male householder with no wife present. There were 259 (8.7%) unmarried opposite-sex partnerships, and 35 (1.2%) same-sex married couples or partnerships. 812 households (27.3%) were made up of individuals, and 215 (7.2%) had someone living alone who was 65 years of age or older. The average household size was 2.44. There were 1,774 families (59.6% of all households); the average family size was 2.97.

The population was spread out, with 1,591 people (21.9%) under the age of 18, 871 people (12.0%) aged 18 to 24, 2,060 people (28.4%) aged 25 to 44, 2,130 people (29.3%) aged 45 to 64, and 613 people (8.4%) who were 65 years of age or older. The median age was 36.2 years. For every 100 females, there were 90.5 males. For every 100 females age 18 and over, there were 86.7 males.

The homeowner vacancy rate was 2.0%; the rental vacancy rate was 5.6%. 59.3% of the population lived in owner-occupied housing units and 40.6% lived in rental housing units.

2000
As of the census of 2000, there were 6,471 people, 2,532 households, and 1,607 families residing in the city. The population density was 3,444/sq mi (1,329/km2). The racial makeup of the city was 83.56% White, 2.33% African American, 0.90% Native American, 3.60% Asian, 0.23% Pacific Islander, 4.40% from other races, and 4.98% from two or more races. Hispanic or Latino of any race were 12.52% of the population.

There were 2,532 households, out of which 35.3% had children under the age of 18 living with them, 44.8% were married couples living together, 13.1% had a female householder with no husband present, and 36.5% were non-families. 23.9% of all households were made up of individuals, and 5.4% had someone living alone who was 65 years of age or older. The average household size was 2.55 and the average family size was 3.05.

The population was distributed, with 25.7% under the age of 18, 10.0% from 18 to 24, 35.6% from 25 to 44, 21.7% from 45 to 64, and 7.1% who were 65 years of age or older. The median age was 34 years. For every 100 females, there were 95.0 males. For every 100 females age 18 and over, there were 90.3 males. The median income for a household was $52,808, and the median income for a family was $62,419. Males had a median income of $44,771 versus $35,779 for females. The per capita income for the city was $24,206. About 5.3% of families and 8.3% of the population were below the poverty line, including 5.5% of those under age 18 and 3.9% of those over age 64.

In the 2000 Census, 89% of the residents reported that English was their primary spoken language. 11% reported languages other than English, including Spanish (8%), Italian (1%), French (1%), Russian (1%), and Portuguese (less than 1%).

Economy
The Cotati Chamber of Commerce is a business organization that promotes economic prosperity within the City of Cotati through economic development services, business services and community events. The chamber is a nonprofit 501(c)(6) organization funded by membership dues, fundraising projects and donations.

Arts and culture
Cotati has numerous annual events, many of them organized by its Community and Environment Commission:
 Pasta Feed and Bingo Night, a fundraising event, usually held in late February or early March
 Farmers' Market, weekly from June to September
 Cotati Accordion Festival, since 1991, usually the third weekend in August
 Cotati Earth Day, around the end of June
 Kids Day Parade and Festival, usually in mid-July
 Accordion Festival, since 1991, usually in mid-August
 Oktoberfest, usually every year in October
 Holiday Tree Lighting Ceremony, usually in early December
 The Downtown Cotati Shop and Stroll, a street fair with locally made crafts and food, live music, kids activities, horse and carriage rides always the Saturday after the tree lighting.

Parks and recreation
As of 1995, Cotati had  of parks. Cotati parks include:
 Cator Field (along School Street, where the tennis courts are located)
 Helen Putnam Park (along Myrtle Avenue, where the dog park and soccer field are located)
 Kotate Park (playground)
 La Plaza Park (along Old Redwood Highway in the center of town, where the bandstand is located and many annual events are held)

Government 
Cotati is governed by a city council with five members, who serve four-year terms.  Each year, council members elect a mayor and vice mayor from among themselves. Municipal election are held in November during even-numbered years. 

The city has its own police department.

According to the California Secretary of State, as of February 10, 2019, Cotati has 4,506 registered voters. Of those, 2,365 (52.5%) are registered Democrats, 701 (15.6%) are registered Republicans, and 1,175 (26.1%) have declined to state a political party.

Education 

The city is served by Cotati-Rohnert Park Unified School District. Thomas Page Elementary School is the only public school actually located in Cotati. The main high school serving Cotati is Rancho Cotate High School, which is in neighboring Rohnert Park.

Cotati is served by the Sonoma County Library, a public library with branches in Rohnert Park and Petaluma.

Infrastructure

Transportation

Cotati is served by bus routes operated by Golden Gate Transit (routes 72, 75, and 80) and Sonoma County Transit.

The nearest major airports are San Francisco International Airport and Oakland International Airport. The Santa Rosa airport, which is closer, also offers passenger service.

From the south, U.S. Route 101 North and State Route 116 West approach Cotati on a multi-lane freeway alignment which Caltrans calls the Cotati Grade, with exits at Railroad Avenue and West Sierra Avenue. From the west, State Route 116 East approaches on the two-lane Gravenstein Highway. From the north, U.S. Route 101 South approaches Cotati as a multi-lane freeway with a single exit at Gravenstein Highway.

Sonoma–Marin Area Rail Transit began service to its Cotati station in August 2017.

See also

 Jim Boggio
 List of cities and towns in California
 List of cities and towns in the San Francisco Bay Area

References

Further reading
 "Access Genealogy: Indian Tribal records, Miwok Indian Tribe. Retrieved on August 6. 2006. A list of all verified Coastal Miwok villages in the area.
 DeClercq, John H. A History of Rohnert Park "from seed to city" , 1977. Retrieved on August 6, 2006. Includes history of the Cotati-Penngrove region.
 Draper, Prudence and Lloyd Draper, Images of America: Cotati. Arcadia Publishing, 2004. . Local history with many old photos.
 Shumway, Burgess M., California Ranchos: Patented Private Land Grants Listed by County. San Bernardino, California: The Borgo Press, 1988. .

External links

Cotati Chamber of Commerce

1963 establishments in California
California Historical Landmarks
Cities in Sonoma County, California
Cities in the San Francisco Bay Area
Incorporated cities and towns in California
Populated places established in 1963